Valentina Artemyeva is a Russian breaststroke swimmer. She is the former European champion in the 50m and 100m Breaststroke (both Short Course).
She is also the world record holder (see World finswimming records) and a former World Champion for the 200m surface in finswimming and bronze medallist in the 100 m Surface.

References

External links
 

1986 births
Living people
Russian female swimmers
Russian female breaststroke swimmers
Finswimmers
Universiade medalists in swimming
Universiade bronze medalists for Russia
Medalists at the 2011 Summer Universiade
Medalists at the 2013 Summer Universiade